The Dodge Omni 024 was a modified version of the popular Dodge Omni made from 1979 to 1982. Analogous to the VW Scirocco, this car was a lower, sportier three-door hatchback coupé version of the Chrysler/Simca Horizon, using the five-door hatchback's floor pan and chassis as a basis. The cars were designed in-house at the prompting of Lee Iacocca.

It used the same chassis and engine options as the Omni but had unique bodywork and front end styling. The base engine was a 1.7 L Volkswagen inline four producing , with a 2.2 L,  Chrysler inline four as an option beginning in 1981. By then, the smaller engine only produced . For the first year, the car had a folding back seat and the wheels were painted in the exterior color. The car's looks promised more performance than the engine could deliver, and the car was not as practical as the Omni. Both the Omni and Horizon prefixes were dropped for 1981, making them the "024" and "TC3", respectively.

The 024 did not sell well and was renamed as the Dodge Charger for the 1983 model year, a name which had been gradually introduced as part of a special "Charger 2.2" package beginning in 1981. The 024 had also been produced as the  Plymouth Horizon TC3. It, too, was renamed in the 1983 model year: to the Plymouth Turismo. The "Turismo" label had already been used on a sport package beginning in 1980.

In its last year, the 024 and TC3 served as a base for the Dodge Rampage and Plymouth Scamp pick-up trucks using the same chassis, powertrain and body parts from the doors forward. 

In 1980 the Plymouth Horizon TC3 also became available with the Turismo sport package. For the Dodge Omni 024 this was called the DeTomaso package, with De Tomaso designed trim and wheels but the standard drivetrain. 1,333 De Tomaso 024's were built in 1980, followed by 619 more in 1981. The 1981 De Tomasos were only available with the new 2.2 litre engine.

Also in 1980, in cooperation with Chrysler partner Mitsubishi, the Chrysler Omni 024 was briefly sold in Japan. It was available for two years at Mitsubishi dealerships and it complied with Japanese Government dimension regulations. It didn't sell well, with only 1491 finding Japanese buyers.

References

External links

Omni 024
Front-wheel-drive vehicles
Subcompact cars
Hatchbacks
1980s cars

Cars introduced in 1979
Cars discontinued in 1982